The fifth series of MasterChef New Zealand was announced in May 2013. Unlike previous series, this series was based around pairs of contestants, similar to the format of Australian series My Kitchen Rules. The series premiered on 2 February 2014. It ran from 7:30 pm through 8:30 pm. Regular episodes aired on Sundays and Mondays, and MasterClass episodes on Saturdays. It was integrated with social media with the hashtag #MasterChefNZ. Karena and Kasey Bird won, with Bec Stanley and Jaimie Stodler as the runners-up.

Contestants

Elimination

There was no elimination in this episode
Only duos who were in the bottom group in the last episode competed in this episode
Multi-episode challenge
 This duo won the competition.
 This duo was the runner-up.
 This duo performed best the challenge.
 This duo performed well in a challenge where no top duo was announced.
 This duo was on the winning team.
 This duo did not compete in this challenge.
 This duo was made from the strongest members of two duos eliminated in the previous challenge.
 This duo was in the bottom group.
 This duo was eliminated.

Episodes

Notes

References

Series 5
2014 New Zealand television seasons